Manusher Mon is a 1972 Bangladeshi film directed by Mostafa Mehmud and starring Razzak and Bobita in lead roles. It was released on 12 February 1972 and is the first film released in independent Bangladesh, following its birth on 16 December 1971.

Music
All songs composed by Satya Saha with lyrics written by Gazi Mazharul Anwar.

"Ami Kotodin Kotoraat Bhebechhi" - Sabina Yasmin, Mohammad Ali Siddiqui 
"O Nagini, Nagini" - Sabina Yasmin, Mohammad Ali Siddiqui 
"Gaaner Kotha" - Ferdousi Rahman 
"Chhobi Jeno Shudhu Chhobi Noy" - Khurshid Alam 
"Ei Shohore Ami Je Ek" - Mohammad Ali Siddiqui

References

External links
 

1972 films
Bengali-language Bangladeshi films
Films scored by Satya Saha
1970s Bengali-language films